This article contains the discography for Melvins, an American rock band. Their discography includes many items that are limited to a few copies which are not represented here.

Albums and extended plays

Studio albums

Extended plays

Live albums

Compilation albums

Singles

Videography

Videos

Music videos

Other contributions

Heavy metal group discographies
Discographies of American artists